Dineshpur is a town and a nagar panchayat in Udham Singh Nagar district in the state of Uttarakhand, India.

Geography

Accessibility 
The nearest Airport is 17 km away at Pantnagar. Nearest Railway Station is 8 Km away at Gularbhoj, Other Nearby Railway Station is Rudrapur City (13 Km).

Demographics
 India census, Dineshpur had a population of 11,343. Males constitute 52% of the population and females 48%. Dineshpur has an average literacy rate of 77%, higher  than the national average of 59.5%: male literacy is 79% and, female literacy is 75%. In Dineshpur, 19% of the population is under 6 years of age.

References

Cities and towns in Udham Singh Nagar district